Hsinchu County (Wade–Giles: Hsin¹-chu²) is a county administered as part of the nominal Taiwan Province of the Republic of China (ROC). Located in north-western Taiwan, the population of the county is mainly Hakka; with a Taiwanese aboriginal minority in the southeastern part of the county. Zhubei is the county seat, where the government office and county office is located. A portion of the Hsinchu Science Park is located in Hsinchu County.

History

Early history
Before the arrival of the Han Chinese, the Hsinchu area was home to the indigenous Taokas, Saisiyat, and Atayal. After the Spanish occupied northern Taiwan, Catholic missionaries arrived at Tek-kham in 1626. Minnanese (Hoklo) and Hakka came and began to cultivate the land from the plains near the sea towards the river valleys and hills.

Qing dynasty
In 1684, Zhuluo County was established during Qing dynasty rule and more Han settled near Tek-kham. A Chinese city was established there in 1711 and renamed Hsinchu in 1875. It became part of Taipeh Prefecture. In the late 19th century, Hoklo people dominated the coastal plains, forcing the Saisiyat and Atayal tribes to move to areas around Jianshi and Wufeng, while the Hakka and Taokas settled together in the river valleys and hills.

Japanese rule
Japanese occupation of Taiwan began after the First Sino-Japanese War in 1895. Hsinchu became known as Shinchiku and, by 1920, its prefecture covered the areas of modern-day Hsinchu County and City, Miaoli, and Taoyuan.

Republic of China
After the handover of Taiwan from Japan to the Republic of China in 1945, Hsinchu County was established on 25 December 1945. In August 1950, Miaoli and Taoyuan were taken out from the county area to form Miaoli County and Taoyuan County respectively. On 16 August 1950, Hsinchu City was incorporated to the county as county-administered city. However, the city was then upgraded again to become a provincial city on 1 July 1982 and was taken out from Hsinchu County area. The county's Xiangshan Township was incorporated into Hsinchu City on 1 July 1982. In 2021, plans are underway to have both Hsinchu county and city  merged into the nation's seventh special municipality.

Geography
Hsinchu County is located at the northwest part of Taiwan Island. The county borders Taoyuan City to the north, Miaoli County to the south, the Taiwan Strait to the west, and the Xueshan & Dabajian mountains to the east.

Climate

The average climate in Hsinchu County is mild.

Administration

Hsinchu County controls 1 city, 3 urban townships, 6 rural townships and 2 mountain indigenous townships. Zhubei City is the seat of Hsinchu County which houses the Hsinchu County Government and Hsinchu County Council. The incumbent Magistrate of Hsinchu County is Yang Wen-ke of the Kuomintang. The administrative division of the county are:

Colors indicate the common language status of Hakka and Formosan languages within each division.

Demographics

The population of the county consists of Hakka, Hoklo, aborigines and new immigrants. The Hakka people constituted around 84% of the total population in 2014, while the aborigines consisted mainly of Atayal and Saisiyat people. As of January 2023, the total population was 582,228, with 285,531 females and 296,697 males in 215,699 households.

Economy

High tech industry
After the founding of Hsinchu Science Park in 1980, a high number of high-tech industries began to grow and expand outside the park, attracting workers coming to work and settle in the county.

Education

Education in Hsinchu County is administered by the Education Department of Hsinchu County Government. The county is home to the Minghsin University of Science and Technology and Ta Hwa University of Science and Technology.

Energy

Power generations
Hsinchu County is home to the gas-fired Hsintao Power Plant with a capacity of 600 MW located in Guanxi Township.

Water supply 
Hsinchu County houses the Baoshan Dam and Baoshan Second Dam.

Tourist attractions

 Beipu Citian Temple
 Mount Dabajian
 Former Residence of Zhang Xueliang
 Green World Ecological Farm
 Leofoo Village Theme Park
 Little Ding-Dong Science Theme Park
 Rueylong Museum
 Shei-Pa National Park
 Tapung Old Fort
 Zhudong Animation and Comic Creative Park
 Zhudong Timber Industry Exhibition Hall
 Beipu Old Street
 Neiwan Old Street
 Emei Huge Buddha Statue

Sports
Hsinchu County has one professional basketball team, the Hsinchu JKO Lioneers of the P. League+.

Transportation

Rail
The Hsinchu Station of the Taiwan High Speed Rail is located in the county at Zhubei City. Hsinchu County is crossed by three Taiwan Railways Administration lines, which are the Liujia Line, Neiwan Line and Western Line.

Notable people 
 Chen Ying-git, singer
 Cyndi Wang, singer-actress
 Hebe Tien, singer-actress and a member of girl group S.H.E
 Joanne Tseng, actress
 Joe Chen, actress
 Landy Wen, singer
 Miu Chu, singer

International relations

Sister cities 
  Miyazaki Prefecture, Japan
  Santa Clara, California, United States
  Westmont, Illinois, United States
  Ipswich, Queensland, Australia

Notes

Words in native languages

References